George Kotaka (born July 28, 1977, Honolulu, Hawaii, United States) is an American karateka. He has a  4th Dan black belt in karate and is the winner of multiple World Karate Championships and appeared in the documentary Empty Hand: The Real Karate Kids.

Achievements

 2002  World Karate Championships Kumite  Gold Medal
 2008  World Karate Championships   Gold Medal

References

External links

Kumite Academy

1977 births
Living people
American male karateka
Karate coaches
Sportspeople from Honolulu
American sportspeople of Japanese descent
Shitō-ryū practitioners
Pan American Games gold medalists for the United States
Pan American Games medalists in karate
Karateka at the 1999 Pan American Games
Medalists at the 1999 Pan American Games
20th-century American people
21st-century American people